Niwiska may refer to the following places:
Niwiska, Subcarpathian Voivodeship (south-east Poland)
Niwiska, Łódź Voivodeship (central Poland)
Niwiska, Lubusz Voivodeship (west Poland)